The fourth cabinet of Lascăr Catargiu was the government of Romania from 27 November 1891 to 3 October 1895.

Ministers
The ministers of the cabinet were as follows:

President of the Council of Ministers:
Lascăr Catargiu (27 November 1891 - 3 October 1895)
Minister of the Interior: 
Lascăr Catargiu (27 November 1891 - 3 October 1895)
Minister of Foreign Affairs: 
Alexandru N. Lahovari (27 November 1891 - 3 October 1895)
Minister of Finance:
Alexandru Știrbei (27 November - 18 December 1891)
Menelas Ghermani (18 December 1891 - 3 October 1895)
Minister of Justice:
Dimitrie C. Sturdza-Scheianu (27 November - 18 December 1891)
Alexandru Marghiloman (18 December 1891 - 3 October 1895)
Minister of War:
Gen. Iacob Lahovari (27 November 1891 - 22 February 1894)
(interim) Lascăr Catargiu (22 February - 12 June 1894)
Gen. Constantin Poenaru (12 June 1894 - 3 October 1895)
Minister of Religious Affairs and Public Instruction:
Take Ionescu (27 November 1891 - 3 October 1895)
Minister of Public Works:
Constantin Olănescu (27 November 1891 - 3 October 1895)
Minister of Agriculture, Industry, Commerce, and Property:
Gen. George Manu (27 November - 18 December 1891)
Petre P. Carp (18 December 1891 - 3 October 1895)

References

Cabinets of Romania
Cabinets established in 1891
Cabinets disestablished in 1895
1891 establishments in Romania
1895 disestablishments in Romania